The Journal of Peptide Science is a monthly peer-reviewed scientific journal, published since 1995 by John Wiley & Sons on behalf of the European Peptide Society. The current editor-in-chief is Paolo Rovero (Universita di Firenze).

Abstracting and indexing 
The Journal of Peptide Science is abstracted and indexed by Chemical Abstracts Service, MEDLINE/PubMed, Scopus, and the Science Citation Index. According to the Journal Citation Reports, the journal has a 2021impact factor of 2.408, ranking it 66th out of 87 journals in the category "Chemistry Analytical" and 255th out of 297 journals in the category "Biochemistry & Molecular Biology".

Most-cited papers 
The three most-cited papers published in this journal are:
 "The cyclization of peptides and depsipeptides", Volume 9, Issue 8, Aug 2003, Pages: 471-501, Davies JS
 "Antibacterial peptides isolated from insects", Volume 6, Issue 10, Oct 2000, Pages: 497-511, Otvos L
 "Amyloid beta-peptide interactions with neuronal and glial cell plasma membrane: Binding sites and implications for Alzheimer's disease", Volume 10, Issue 5, May 2004, Pages: 229-248, Verdier Y, Zarandi M, Penke B

References

External links 
 
 European Peptide Society

Chemistry journals
Wiley (publisher) academic journals
Publications established in 1995
English-language journals
Monthly journals